The Woodlands Trace National Scenic Byway, also known as "The Trace," is the major north–south roadway that traverses the Land Between the Lakes National Recreation Area in two counties in western Kentucky and northwestern Stewart County in northwest Middle Tennessee. It is estimated to be  in length. The road is part of the National Scenic Byway system. Although it is not signed, it is listed on LBL's road logs as FD-100.

Description
 
The road is called "The Trace", which is what many roads and paths were called in pioneer times.  "Trace" is short for "Buffalo Trace" that many winding roads have been called since they seem to follow the winding path of buffalo or bison.  The Trace begins as Tennessee State Route 461 (SR 461) at the intersection with US 79 (running concurrently with a hidden designation of SR 76) on the west side of Dover in Stewart County, Tennessee. SR 461 ends at the southern boundary of the Land Between the Lakes National Recreation Area, but continues solely as the Trace. The recreation area is situated on an inland peninsula between Kentucky Lake (the Tennessee River) and Lake Barkley (the Cumberland River). It passes the remains of an old furnace as well as the 1850s Homeplace living history farm before the road makes its entry into Kentucky at the state line.

It enters Trigg County shortly after passing the Homeplace. It passes through more wooded areas and has two intersections with back-country roads, including one of which will lead to the Wrangler's Campground, the LBL's premier destination for horseback riding and camping. After passing the Golden Pond Visitor's Center, the Trace has a freeway-style diamond interchange junction with the co-signed four-lane U.S. Route 68 and Kentucky Route 80. US 68/KY 80 was formerly accessed from the trace via an access road near the visitor's center. The diamond interchange was built when US 68/KY 80 was widened within LBL in the early 2010s as part of the widening project of the route in Trigg County.

The Trace goes further north and passes the Elk and Bison Prairie, and other roads that link the Trace to more recreational areas, campgrounds, and one that leads to the Woodlands Nature Station after crossing into the Lyon County section of the recreation area. The Trace reaches its northern end at the Between the Rivers Memorial Bridge on the LBL's northern boundary just short of the Lyon-Livingston County line.

The rest of the road beyond the bridge is signed as Kentucky Route 453 (KY 453) from the northern end of the bridge, through Grand Rivers, all the way to Smithland, Kentucky. Access to US 62/641 and Interstate 24 (I-24) at Exit 31 is available just north of Grand Rivers well into Livingston County.

History
Before the Land Between the Lakes NRA was established, the Kentucky segment of the Trace was designated as Kentucky Route 453 (KY 453), and the Tennessee segment was Tennessee State Route 49 (SR 49). They were both decommissioned from the Trace after the LBL was acquired by the USDA's Forest Service from the Tennessee Valley Authority, the previous owner of the recreation area. However, some road maps still classify The Trace as KY 453 and SR 49. 

The recreation area itself, however, was established in 1963 after the TVA built the Kentucky Dam and the U.S. Army Corps of Engineers impounded the Cumberland River to build the other dam that created Lake Barkley. The state road designations remained until the forest service's acquisition of the park.

Major intersections

See also

References

External links
USDA Forest Service's Land Between the Lakes National Recteation Area - website
Friends of Land Between The Lakes
Motor Vehicle Usage Map at LBL.org
LBL Recreation Map
America's Byways

National Scenic Byways
Transportation in Stewart County, Tennessee
Transportation in Trigg County, Kentucky
Transportation in Lyon County, Kentucky